Koninklijke Football Club Eendracht Zele is a Belgian association football club from the city of Zele, in East Flanders.

History 
The club was founded in 1927 as SK Zele and remained that way for 25 years, as the name of the association was renamed the KSK Zele in 1952. The name KSK Zele would eventually last 18 more years, until 1970, when several mergers, a merger of the KSK Zele to the KFC Scela Zele and FC De Zeven, to currently playing as club KFC Eendracht Zele. the clubs matricule number is 1046 and the team colours are black and red.

Current squad

References

External links 
Eendracht Zele Official Website 

 
Association football clubs established in 1970
Football clubs in Belgium
Sport in East Flanders
1970 establishments in Belgium
Zele